Gamper is a surname. Notable people with the surname include:

 David Gamper (1945–2011), American composer 
 Joan Gamper (1877–1930), Swiss football pioneer, player, and club president
 John Gamper (1870–1946), American politician
 Martino Gamper (born 1971), Italian designer
 Patrick Gamper (born 1997), Austrian cyclist
 Yermolay Gamper (1750–1814), Russian military commander

Surnames of South Tyrolean origin
Surnames of Austrian origin

German toponymic surnames